Shebbeare is a surname, and may refer to:

John Shebbeare (1709–1788), British Tory political satirist
Robert Shebbeare (1827–1860), English recipient of the Victoria Cross
Edward Oswald Shebbeare (1884-1964), British mountaineer, naturalist and forester
Tom Shebbeare (born 1952), British business executive